The Premios 40 Principales for Best Mexican Act was an honor presented annually at Los Premios 40 Principales between 2007 and 2011, later reemerging in 2014 as part of Los Premios 40 Principales América.

References

2011 music awards